The Witch's Tale is a horror-fantasy radio series which aired from May 21, 1931, to June 13, 1938, on WOR, the Mutual Radio Network, and in syndication. The program was created, written, and directed by Alonzo Deen Cole (February 22, 1897, St. Paul, Minnesota - April 7, 1971).

Production and casting
The first horror drama on radio, Cole's spooky show was hosted by Old Nancy, the Witch of Salem, who introduced a different terror tale each week. The role of Old Nancy was created by stage actress Adelaide Fitz-Allen, who died in 1935 at the age of 79. Cole replaced her with 13-year-old Miriam Wolfe, and Martha Wentworth was also heard as Old Nancy on occasion. Cole himself provided the sounds of Old Nancy's cat, Satan. Cole's wife, Marie O'Flynn, portrayed the lead female characters on the program, and the supporting cast included Mark Smith and Alan Devitte.

The majority of the scripts were original stories, but there were literary adaptations as well, including: 
 1931: "The Bronze Venus," adapted from La Vénus d'Ille by Prosper Mérimée. 
 1932: "In the Devil's Name," adapted from the confessions of supposed real-life witch Isobel Gowdie. (Only the first half of this episode has survived.) 
 1934: "The Wonderful Bottle," adapted from The Bottle Imp by Robert Louis Stevenson. 
 1934: "The Flying Dutchman," based on the legend of the ghost ship The Flying Dutchman.  
 1935: an adaptation of Frankenstein by Mary Shelley.   
There were likely other adaptations that have not survived.

For syndication, the shows were recorded live during broadcast and distributed to other stations. These recordings were destroyed by Cole in 1961, so few episodes survive. Cole was also the writer, producer, and director of the radio mystery-crime drama, Casey, Crime Photographer.

In November 1936, Alonzo Deen Cole edited The Witch's Tales magazine with the lead story by Cole. It ran for only two issues.

Television
An effort was made to bring the series to television. In 1958, Television Programs of America made plans to film a pilot with Cole as consultant and story supervisor. The associate story editor was Raymond Levy. However, the show never made it to TV.

Influence
EC Comics' publisher Bill Gaines was inspired by Cole's Old Nancy host to create the character the Old Witch, illustrated by Graham Ingels as the host of EC's The Haunt of Fear.

See also
Lights Out

References

Further reading
Cole, Alonzo Deen, edited by David S. Siegel with introduction by Miriam Wolff. The Witch's Tale (253 pages). Dunwich Press, 1998. 13 scripts plus episode log and biographical sketch of Cole.

External links
Radio Lovers: The Witch's Tale (four 1934-37 episodes)
SF Site: Lisa DuMond review of The Witch's Tale script collection (1998)
Radio Horror Hosts: The Witch's Tale
Internet Archive: The Witch's Tale
OTR Plot Spot: The Witch's Tale - plot summaries and reviews.

American radio dramas
Anthology radio series
Fantasy radio programs
Horror fiction radio programmes
1930s American radio programs
Mutual Broadcasting System programs
1931 radio programme debuts
1938 radio programme endings
Syndicated radio programs